Josiah Fisher (born circa 1654-1736) represented Dedham, Massachusetts in the Great and General Court. He served as selectman for five terms beginning in 1697.

Fisher was 16 years old when his father, Anthony, died and left him the family estate. He was the grandson of Anthony Fisher. Upon his death in 1736, he left his home, known today as the Fisher-Whiting House, to his grandson, Jonathan.

Notes

References

Works cited

Members of the colonial Massachusetts General Court from Dedham
1654 births
1670 deaths
Dedham, Massachusetts selectmen